City of Bangor was a freighter that had a 30-year career on the Great Lakes. Originally designed to carry ore, the ship was converted into an automobile carrier in 1925. She was trapped in ice on Lake Superior November 30, 1926, and after multiple salvage attempts, Bangor was declared a total loss.

Shipwreck
City of Bangor was captained by William J. Mackin. On the night of November 30, 1926, Bangor was carrying 248 new Chrysler automobiles from Detroit, Michigan to Duluth, Minnesota, when a severe storm drove her onto the rocks of the Keweenaw Peninsula, on Michigan's Upper Peninsula. Eighteen cars that were spiked to the deck of the ship slipped overboard and were lost. During the same storm, Thomas Maytham, which was carrying 20,000 tons of grain from Duluth to Toledo, Ohio, went aground on the other side of the peninsula.

Rescue
The next morning, after the winds had subsided, Bangors crew managed to free the lifeboats, and by afternoon all the men had made it ashore. They began to walk to the nearest village, Copper Harbor, which was about 15 miles away, but became lost in the unfamiliar territory. They spent the night with a fire but no shelter, inadequate clothing, and no food.

The next day, a United States Coast Guard rescue lifeboat, out of Eagle Harbor Life Saving Station, came around the point while carrying Thomas Maythams crew, and discovered Bangors crew. The Coast Guard captain dropped off the men from Thomas Maytham at Copper Harbor and returned for the men from City of Bangor. The men were exhausted and suffering from hypothermia; several were hospitalized with frostbite.

The majority of the Chryslers were in the hold, separated from the flooded engine room by a strong partition. A visual inspection of the hold showed that the cars were in good condition. When the water around the wrecked ship had frozen solid, an ice ramp was constructed, and the cars were driven off the ship. When the roads opened in the spring, the cars were driven to Calumet, Michigan, loaded onto trains, and taken to Detroit for repair and re-sale. City of Bangor herself was a total loss, but 202 of the vehicles were salvaged from the wreck and sold. It was partially cut up for scrap metal during World War II.

The City of Bangor wreck site is now part of the Keweenaw Underwater Preserve, established in 1991, along with the nearby wrecks of Altadoc and Scotia, and she can be visited by scuba divers. The only remaining part of the Eagle Harbor Life Saving Station, the boathouse, is now a museum containing shipwreck memorabilia including one of the 1927 Chryslers from City of Bangor.

References

Sources

External links
 Maritime History of the Great Lakes: Shipwrecks: City of Bangor

Shipwrecks of Lake Superior
Maritime incidents in 1926
1896 ships
Ships built in Bay City, Michigan
Wreck diving sites